The 45th District of the Iowa House of Representatives in the state of Iowa.

Current elected officials
Beth Wessel-Kroeschell is the representative currently representing the district.

Past representatives
The district has previously been represented by:
 Ivor W. Stanley, 1971–1973
 Dale M. Cochran, 1973–1983
 Minnette Doderer, 1983–2001
 Vicki Lensing, 2001–2003
 Jane Greimann, 2003–2005
 Beth Wessel-Kroeschell, 2005–present

References

045